Roland de Mecquenem may refer to:

Roland de Mecquenem (archaeologist) (1877–1957), French archaeologist
Roland de Mecquenem (soldier), French army officer